Tales from the White Hart is a collection of short stories by science fiction writer Arthur C. Clarke, in the "club tales" style.

Thirteen of the fifteen stories originally appeared across a number of different publications. "Moving Spirit" and "The Defenestration of Ermintrude Inch" were first published in this book and hence presumably were written specifically for it. "The Defenestration of Ermintrude Inch" rounds off the cycle of stories and explicitly mentions their book publication.

The White Hart is a pub (modelled on the White Horse, New Fetter Lane, just north of Fleet Street, once the weekly rendezvous of science fiction fans in London till the mid 50s, when they moved to the Globe pub in Hatton Garden) where a character named Harry Purvis tells a series of tall tales. Incidental characters inhabiting the White Hart include science fiction writers Samuel Youd (also known as John Christopher), John Wyndham (John Beynon), and Clarke himself in addition to the narrative voice as his pseudonym Charles Willis.

The style and nature of the stories was inspired by the Jorkens stories of the writer Lord Dunsany, whom Clarke admired and with whom he corresponded, a fact humorously acknowledged by Clarke in his introduction to the first Jorkens omnibus volume.

One additional story from the White Hart 'universe', "Let There Be Light", is reprinted in Tales of Ten Worlds.

Clarke and Stephen Baxter collaborated on one final White Hart story, "Time, Gentlemen, Please" for a 2007 limited edition from PS Publishing, issued for the book's 50th anniversary. ("Let There Be Light" does not appear in that edition.)

Contents
The collection, originally published in paperback in 1957 by Ballantine Books, includes:

Preface
"Silence Please"
"Big Game Hunt"
"Patent Pending"
"Armaments Race"
"Critical Mass"
"The Ultimate Melody"
"The Pacifist"
"The Next Tenants"
"Moving Spirit"
"The Man Who Ploughed the Sea"
"The Reluctant Orchid"
"Cold War"
"What Goes Up"
"Sleeping Beauty"
"The Defenestration of Ermintrude Inch"

Reception
Galaxy reviewer Floyd C. Gale praised the collection as "as light and frothy a conglomeration of sidesplitters as it has been my good fortune to read."

Citations

General sources

External links 
 

 
1957 short story collections
Ballantine Books books
White Hart
Short story collections by Arthur C. Clarke